The Scott Commercial Building is a historic building located in Sarasota, Florida at 261 South Orange Avenue.

History
In 1959, Clarence Scott commissioned William Rupp and Joseph Farrell to design a commercial building that would serve as a showroom for the Barkus Furniture Company. Rupp and Farrell designed the building the following year. The building displays the characteristics of the Sarasota School of Architecture in planning and design, which was a prominent design in Central Florida. The building features a stucco exterior, large picture windows, and large extending concrete rafter beams.

In 2016, the building was restored by architect Guy Peterson and builder Michael Walker. It was rededicated as McCulloch Pavilion and now serves as the Center for Architecture Sarasota, a community-based architecture/cultural organization. On June 7, 2016, the building was added to the National Register of Historic Places.

References

External links
 Sarasota County listings at National Register of Historic Places
 Florida's Office of Cultural and Historical Programs

National Register of Historic Places in Sarasota County, Florida
Buildings and structures completed in 1960